Miss Mitchell's Comet (formally designated C/1847 T1) is a non-periodic comet that American astronomer Maria Mitchell discovered  in 1847.

The discovery was initially credited to Francesco de Vico. Vico, observing from Rome, was the first to report the comet's discovery in Europe. However, Mitchell observed the comet two days before Vico did, so she became recognized as the comet's discoverer.

The comet had a weakly hyperbolic orbit solution while inside the planetary region of the Solar System. An orbit solution when the comet is outside of the planetary region shows that the comet is bound to the Sun.

References
 

18471001
Non-periodic comets